Matthew Paterson may refer to:

 Matt Paterson (born 1989), Scottish footballer
 Matt Paterson (footballer born 1888), Scottish footballer
 Matthew C. Paterson (died 1846), American lawyer and politician from New York